The Roxy (sometimes Roxy NYC) was a popular nightclub located at 515 West 18th Street in New York City. Located in the Chelsea section of Manhattan, it began as a roller skating rink and roller disco in 1978, founded by Steve Bauman, Richard Newhouse and Steve Greenberg. It was acquired in 1985 by Gene DiNino. The Roxy shut down permanently in March 2007.

Operation 
Beginning in the early 1980s, the owners began hosting private party nights. Referred to by many as the "Studio 54 of roller rinks", these parties thrived for several years. Then, as the popularity of skating began to fade, the space was revamped into a dance club in June 1982 by Ruza Blue whose idea it was to transform the roller rink into a dance club.

The Roxy hosted a party for the famed Olympic gold medal-winning USA Ice Hockey team in 1980.

Ruza Blue, nicknamed "Kool Lady Blue", founded an all-races dance club in June 1982 (formerly at Club Negril 1981 - 82) which featured a mash up of all musical styles from early hip hop, electro, funk, soul, disco, rock, punk, dub and electronic dance music. Jon Baker, the future founder of Gee Street Records, worked the door. Hip hop pioneers such as Grand Mixer D.ST Jazzy Jay and  Afrika Bambaataa began DJing there and the club sponsored breaking or b-boy/b-girl competitions featuring the Rock Steady Crew, Floor Master Crew New York City Breakers, graffiti artists' murals, and even double- exhibitions by The Fantastic Four local American Double Dutch League champions with emcees hosting the nights.

Blue's club nites had a major influence on the creation and evolution of Hip Hop and Electronic dance music energizing Hip Hop culture on to the world stage where it blew up and changed the world! Artists such as Madonna, Run DMC, Kraftwerk, Shannon, Malcolm McLaren, New Edition, Kurtis Blow, The Beastie Boys, Yello, Dead or Alive, Cher, Beyoncé, Mariah Carey, Bette Midler, Whitney Houston, Liza Minnelli, Chaka Khan, Donna Summer, Cyndi Lauper, Grace Jones, Yoko Ono, LL Cool J, Lisa Marie Presley, Gloria Gaynor, and George Clinton and the P-Funk All-Stars all performed at the Roxy.

The site of many "dance floor tests" by recording artists, producers and remixers, the clubs's notoriously discerning, racially mixed clientele and cross cultural ethos was considered the ideal crowd to inspire on the dance floor. It was here that DJ's first played the test record of EBN-OZN's white rap/spoken word "AEIOU Sometimes Y" in 1982, the first commercially released record made on a computer in the United States.

The Roxy hosted one of New York City's largest weekly gay dance nights, Roxy Saturdays, promoted by John Blair Promotions, which featured many famous DJs including Junior Vasquez, Manny Lehman, Hex Hector, Victor Calderone, David Guetta, Frankie Knuckles, Paul van Dyk, Offer Nissim, Hector Fonseca and Peter Rauhofer.

During the late 1980s, it was operated under the name 1018, and was closed down in 1989 by the New York City Office of Midtown Enforcement as a nuisance, based on allegations of underaged drinking, drug sales, and violence.

Closure
Roxy had stopped for several weeks in the fall of 2006, but resumed operation once again on December 2, 2006. The club closed its doors for good on March 10, 2007.  A documentary about the club's final party, entitled "Roxy: The Last Dance" premiered in August 2008 on the LOGO cable television network.

There were plans for the club to be demolished in order to make room for new residential apartments. However, in July 2008, there was news that the Roxy would reopen under new management. The local community board that represents the interests of the residents near the club have stated that the club could reopen if it served the community in the long run.

As of September 2017, the building is undergoing demolition to make way for high-end residential condominiums overlooking the adjacent High Line Park.

In popular culture
A performance at the club by Afrika Bambaattaa was captured in the 1984 film Beat Street. Another performance was recorded of Frank Zappa called Live at the Roxy.

See also
 Danceteria
 Palladium
 Studio 54
 The Limelight
 Twilo
 Webster Hall

References 

 Radcliffe, Joe, "NY Roxy Owner Sees Sunshine", Billboard Magazine, November 15, 1980, pp. 72–73
 DJ Julio, "Vintage Roxy Photos and Letters"

External links
 Roxy: The Last Dance documentary
 John Blair Promotions - John Blair & Beto Sutter

Nightclubs in Manhattan
Defunct drinking establishments in Manhattan
Roller skating rinks
2007 disestablishments in New York (state)
Chelsea, Manhattan
1978 establishments in New York City
Defunct nightclubs in New York (state)
Former music venues in New York City